Tears, Lies, and Alibis is the eleventh studio album by Shelby Lynne, released on April 20, 2010, on Lynne's own newly founded record label, Everso Records.

Critical reception
It received generally positive reviews, with a composite review of 72 on Metacritic. Thom Jurek of AllMusic said it was "produced with exquisite balance".

Track listing
All songs written by Shelby Lynne.

Personnel
 Brian Harrison − percussion
 John Jackson − dobro, acoustic guitar, electric guitar, harmonica
 Dave Jacques − upright bass
 Mark Jordan − Hammond B-3 organ, piano
 Randy Leago − saxophone
 Shelby Lynne − acoustic guitar, electric guitar, lead vocals, background vocals
 David Hood − bass guitar
 Val McCallum − acoustic guitar, electric guitar
 Kenny Malone – drums, percussion
 Spooner Oldham – Fender Rhodes, Wurlitzer
 Bryan Owings – drums, percussion
 Ben Peeler – banjo, mandola, mandolin, Weissenborn
 Rick Reed – drums

Chart performance
Tears, Lies and Alibis peaked at #108 on the U.S. Billboard 200.

References

2010 albums
Shelby Lynne albums